Slater's worm lizard (Amphisbaena slateri) is a species of amphisbaenian in the family Amphisbaenidae. The species is endemic to western South America.

Etymology
The specific name, slateri, is in honor of Thomas Slater who collected the holotype.

Geographic range
A. slateri is found in Peru and Bolivia.

Habitat

Description
A. slateri has a rounded head and a rounded tail tip. The body coloration is uniformly brown dorsally and ventrally.

Reproduction
A. slateri is oviparous.

References

Further reading
Boulenger GA (1907). "Descriptions of new Lizards in the British Museum". Annals and Magazine of Natural History, Seventh Series 19: 486–489, (Amphisbæna slateri, new species, pp. 486–487).
Costa HC, Welton LJ, Hallerman J (2019). "An updated diagnosis of the rare Amphisbaena slateri Boulenger, 1907, based on additional specimens (Squamata, Amphisbaenia, Amphisbaenidae)". Evolutionary Systematics 2 (2): 125–135.
Gans C (2005). "Checklist and Bibliography of the Amphisbaenia of the World". Bulletin of the American Museum of Natural History (289): 1–130. (Amphisbaena slateri, p. 19).
Vanzolini PE (2002). "An aid to the identification of the South American species of Amphisbaena (Squamata, Amphisbaenidae)". Papéis Avulsos de Zoologia, Museu de Zoologia da Universidade de São Paulo 42 (15): 351–362.

Amphisbaena (lizard)
Reptiles described in 1907
Taxa named by George Albert Boulenger